Muhammad Sufian bin Anuar (born 26 August 1987) is a former Singapore international footballer who played  as a forward.

Sufian spent most of his career times as the team backup striker role.

Club career

LionsXII

2012 season

In the 2012 season, Sufian joined LionsXII. On 6 March, he scored his first goal of the season, scoring the Lions' second goal in a 3–1 win against FELDA United. On 20 March, he scored against Selangor at the Jalan Besar Stadium, though the match ended in a 1–1 draw. On 12 May, he scored the Lions' second goal in a 3–3 draw against Kedah. On 16 June, he scored a header from Shaiful Esah free kick in a 9–0 defeat of Sabah. On 19 June, Sufian scored a late winner against Terengganu away from home. However, the Lions finished league runners-up. Sufian was left out of V. Sundramoorthy 2013 squad as the Lions added the under-23 squad players to replace the current squad.

2014 season

During the 2014 season, Sufian rejoined the Lions XII squad after team captain Shahril Ishak, Hariss Harun and Baihakki Khaizan left the squad. However, he could not make the starting line-up as fellow LionsXII striker, Khairul Amri, was first choice under head coach Fandi Ahmad. On 15 April, during the game against Pahang, Sufian replaced the injured Khairul Nizam, and in the dying minutes of the game, he became the second LionsXII player to score a hat-trick, (first was by Hariss Harun during the game against Sabah) as the Lions won 4–1. He scored a total of 4 goals in 21 matches for the club.

2015 season
In January 2015, he rejoined Warriors FC. Despite spending most of his time on the bench, he still managed to score 4 goals in 23 appearances for the club.

2016 season
He joined Tampines Rovers FC to serve as a backup striker for Fazrul Nawaz.

Honours
Singapore U17
 Lion City Cup: 2004 

LionsXII
Malaysia Super League: 2013
FA Cup Malaysia: 2015

References

External links
 

1987 births
Living people
Singapore international footballers
Singaporean footballers
Association football forwards
Home United FC players
Warriors FC players
LionsXII players
Singapore Premier League players
Malaysia Super League players
Young Lions FC players
Singaporean people of Malay descent